The North Siberian Lowland, also known as Taymyr Lowland (Таймырская низменность), is a plain with a relatively flat relief separating the Byrranga Mountains of the Taymyr Peninsula in the north from the Central Siberian Plateau in the south. To the southeast of the Olenyok basin the lowland merges with the Central Yakutian Lowland.

The territory of the lowland is one of the Great Russian Regions. Administratively it is mostly part of the Krasnoyarsk Krai, with a small section in the Sakha Republic (Yakutia). The main towns are Dudinka, Norilsk and Khatanga.

Geography

The North Siberian Lowland  lies between the lower reaches of the Yenisey and Olenyok rivers in Krasnoyarsk Krai and Yakutia. 
It is 1,400 km long and up to 600 km wide. This lowland plain features flat-topped ridges approximately 200-300 m high, which rise over broad and heavily swamped degradations with a large number of thermokarst lakes.

Rivers Pyasina, Taymyra, Kheta and Kotuy flow over the North Siberian Lowland, as well as further east the Khatanga, Popigay, Kuoyka, Beyenchime, Bur, Buolkalakh, as well as the Anabar with its tributaries the Suolama and Udya, and the Uele. There are many lakes in the North Siberian Lowland, the biggest one is Lake Taymyr. 

The North Siberian Lowland has deposits of oil, natural gas and coal (Taymyr Basin).

Geology
The North Siberian Lowland is formed by marine and ice-laid deposits, underlaid with sandstones and argillites. Permafrost is a common phenomenon in this area.

Climate and flora
The climate is subarctic continental with long (7–8 months) cold winters and short cool summers. Average temperature in January is -30 degrees Celsius in the West and down to -35-37 degrees Celsius in the East. Temperature in July is around 6-10 degrees Celsius. Snow cover stays for approximately 265 days. Precipitation is 250-300 mm per year.

Sparse forest in the west consists mainly of Siberian larch. Eastern parts of the lowland are covered with Dahurian larch. Lichen tundra dominates northern parts of the lowland, while southern parts are full of shrubbery vegetation.

See also
Anabar Plateau
Alas (geography)

References

External links

Middle Siberia Geography (in Russian)